Ugod is a small village in the North-Western part of Hungary, in Veszprém county, near Mount Bakony and close to Lake Balaton, at the juncture of Bakony and Little Alföld. The town is a great starting point for hikers, hunters and the lovers of countryside.

Distances: Budapest (150 km), Győr (60 km), Lake Balaton (80 km), Veszprém (60 km), Pápa (15 km).

History 

First written mention of the village from 1289. King László IV dated a charter during a campaign in this year. It  is supposed that the Fortress of Ugod still existed at that time but it is doubtful. Because that charter dated  "in Ugod" instead of "in Ugod fortress" or "under Ugod fortress" as usual at that time.

During Árpád Dynasty Ugod was the part of Bakony Erdőispánság. Ispán is the ruler of the territory. King Stephen V signed Csák Lukács's son Demeter and his posteriors to be forever ispán of that territory and allowed him to build fortress.

Csák family was relative to the dynasty. Their origin is from the Honfoglalás (settlement of the Magyars). Due  to Anonymus and Képes Krónika Csák was the son of Chief Előd's great-grandchild Szabolcs. From that Csák is the  family originated. That family was streamed to 12 arm. One of them called ugodi. That arm's earliest known member  was Csák Lukács. In this family the name Ugrin (means Hungarian man) was very popular. One form of that name with  diminutive -d is Ugod.

That was the name of Demeter's son or grandson, who after the village is nominated.

Jews lived in the village in the 19th and 20th centuries, dozens of whom were murdered in the Holocaust.

Sights 

 Roman Catholic church (former fortress)
 Parish
 Pieta in front of parish
 Chalk-smelters around the village
 Ugod Lake
 Stephen I's statue
 Hubertlak in the surrounding forest

References

External links 
 Official Homepage

Populated places in Veszprém County
Jewish communities destroyed in the Holocaust